Guido I may refer to:

 Guido I da Polenta (d. 1297)
 Guido I da Montefeltro (1223–1298)